The 2005 Hazfi Cup Final was a two-legged football tie in order to determine the 2004–05 Hazfi Cup champion of Iranian football clubs. Aboomoslem faced Saba in this final game.. The first leg took place on July 12, 2005 at Saba City Stadium in Tehran and the second leg took place on July 15, 2005 at Samen Al-Aeme Stadium, Mashhad.

Format 
The rules for the final were exactly the same as the one in the previous knockout rounds. The tie was contested over two legs with away goals deciding the winner if the two teams were level on goals after the second leg. If the teams could still not be separated at that stage, then extra time would have been played with a penalty shootout (taking place if the teams were still level after extra time).

Route to the final

Final Summary

First Leg

Second Leg

Champions

See also 
 2004–05 Iran Pro League
 2004–05 Azadegan League
 2004–05 Iran Football's 2nd Division
 2004–05 Iran Football's 3rd Division
 2004–05 Hazfi Cup
 2004–05 Iranian Futsal Super League
 Iranian Super Cup

2005
Haz